Alister Campbell may refer to:
 Alister James Campbell (born 1959), Scottish rugby union player
 Alister Munro Campbell (born 1979), Australian rugby union player

See also 
Alistair Campbell (disambiguation)